The 2nd Ulster Trophy was a Formula One motor race held on 9 August 1947 at the Ballyclare circuit in Northern Ireland. The 36 lap race was won from pole position by Bob Gerard in an ERA B-Type, setting fastest lap in the process. Barry Woodall finished second in a Delage 15S8, and George Abecassis was third in an ERA A-Type.

Results

References

Ulster Trophy
Brit
1947 in Northern Ireland